The World Trade Center Mexico City, commonly known by its former name, Hotel de México, is a building complex located in the wealthy neighborhood of Colonia Nápoles in central Mexico City. It is the third tallest building in Mexico City when including antenna, and at its roof height, it stands .

The complex includes a convention center, cultural center, parking facilities, a multi-screen cinema, a revolving 45th-floor luxury restaurant, and a shopping center with Sears (originally opened as a JCPenney, the first location outside of the USA) as an anchor tenant. It will also include a 22-floor hotel, which is currently under construction.

Located on Avenida de los Insurgentes, the complex is served by the Polyforum station of the Metrobús Bus rapid transit system, located a few meters away. The station is named after the Polyforum Cultural Siqueiros, a part of the WTC complex.

History
The WTC México began its existence as the Hotel de México, a building and complex that did not perform as intended.

Construction of the Hotel de México was in a lot called "Parque de La Lama" located in the Napoles neighborhood (Spanish: Colonia Nápoles).  The lot was set aside by real estate businessperson, José Jerónimo de La Lama in 1947. However, by 1966, when the project started, the owner and financial sponsor was Manuel Suárez y Suárez.

The Hotel de México project included a hotel building as well as a cultural center housing the Polyforum Cultural Siqueiros and several other facilities aimed at making the complex a hub for business, culture, tourism, and architecture. Plans for the complex were presented at the 13th international architecture contest in Munich.

Projected to be ready for the 1968 Olympics, the project overran and exceeded its budget. Although the main tower was completed in 1972, it did not function as a hotel, due to political and economic reasons. The tower–as well as the rest of the complex–was left in an unfinished state, aside from the Polyforum.

In the mid-1980s, a project was started to turn the Hotel de México complex into an international business center. Mr. Suárez backed the idea, and although he died in 1988, the remodeling began with partial public funding in 1992. In 1995, the complex–now known as World Trade Center México–opened its doors with the tower functioning as an office building and convention center.

Floors 40 and 41 housed TV studios for Corporación de Noticias e Información, which operated XHTVM Canal 40. On May 19, 2005, these floors were evacuated after the beginning of a strike at CNI. Due to the legal cases that have followed CNI since 2005, the facilities have remained untouched since.

The WTC also houses the transmission facilities for XHFO-FM.

Most recently, the World Trade Center added a second theater: the 7,500-seat Pepsi Center WTC, which was completed in 2012. It is used primarily for concerts and stage shows.

Functions 

WTC Tower has a seismic detector that monitors land movements to stop elevators during earthquakes. It is considered an intelligent building due to its intelligent light system.

The tower is managed by a system that controls the facilities and equipment. This includes the electrics, mechanical ventilation, sanitation, elevators and fire protection.

See also
List of tallest buildings in Mexico City

External links
 CIEC WTC Official Website
 Pepsi Center WTC Official Website
 Nuevo Portal Torre WTC
 Interview with Manuel Suárez - November 2005
 Biography of Manuel Suárez via La Nueva España

References

Skyscraper office buildings in Mexico City
Mexico
Benito Juárez, Mexico City
Buildings and structures with revolving restaurants
Office buildings completed in 1972
1970s in Mexico City
20th-century architecture in Mexico
Convention centers in Mexico
Music venues in Mexico
Theatres in Mexico City